Pirates: Adventures in Art is a Canadian computer-animated children's television series which aired on CBC Television in Canada from December 18, 2010 to November 13, 2011. The show, produced by DHX Media, was creative-produced and executive-story edited by Jed MacKay, produced by Katrina Walsh and directed by William Gordon.

The show tells the story of three pirates who sail the seas in search of art, always dodging the evil, art-hating queen Conformia. The show’s theme song was performed by Canadian band Great Big Sea. 22 episodes were produced.

Cast
 Joseph Motiki as Leo
 Tajja Isen as Cleo
 Carlos Diaz as Fresco de Gecko
 Jayne Eastwood as Queen Conformia
 James Rankin as Krank and Skelly

Episodes

References

External links
 

CBC Television original programming
Canadian children's animated musical television series
Television series by DHX Media
2010s Canadian animated television series
2010 Canadian television series debuts
2011 Canadian television series endings
Canadian children's animated adventure television series
Canadian children's animated fantasy television series
Television series about pirates